Hajji Gerandiqo Berzeg was a Circassian military commander who served as the 6th leader of the Circassian Confederation from 1860 to 1864. Most of his life, including his late childhood, was spent in the Russo-Circassian War (1763-1864) fronts. He reportedly met his own son in the battlefield, where he lost two of his other sons. After the Circassian genocide, he was exiled to the Ottoman Empire, volunteered in the Ottoman army against Russia, and died there of old age.

Biography

Early life 
Not much is recorded about Berzeg's early life, as Circassians did not write down their history, and all knowledge comes from Russian sources. Gerandiqo Berzeg was born in the Mytykhuasua village of Ş̂açə (Sochi). His father was Hatajuq Berzeg, and his uncle was Ismail Berzeg, the prince of Ubykhia. He spent his youth in Russo-Circassian War fronts. Being a pious Muslim, he went to Mecca for hajj in 1839.

Military career 
After returning from hajj, he joined the war again. His first big military success was in Sukhumi, 1841, when he freed the Sadz region from Russian occupation. In 1846, with the death of Ismail Berzeg, he was elected as the prince of Ubykhia. In 1857, he unified his forces with Ishamil Zayush and attacked the Russian forces in Gagra. His biggest campaign was in 1854 when he set out to re-capture areas and forts invaded by the Russian army, and vastly succeeded.

In 1860, when he was 60 years old, he helped unite Circassia and was elected the president of the Independence Majlis of Circassia.

Life in exile 
After the defeat in 1864, he could not decide whether to accept defeat or fight one last battle and die. He went to meet with Mikhail Chacba, prince of Abkhazia to ask for advice. When he was absent, his army of 3 thousand were attacked by the Russian army, and caught without a leader, were completely destroyed. After this, to avoid further bloodshed, Berzeg decided to admit defeat. On March 24, 1864, Berzeg declared full surrender on behalf of the Circassian people and was exiled to Ottoman territory.

After the Circassian genocide, he was personally invited by Sultan Abdulaziz of the Ottoman Empire and honored. He was offered a noble house in Istanbul but he formally rejected this offer and moved to a small village in Manyas instead. During the Russo-Turkish war of 1877-1878, he assembled an army of Circassians and returned to fight against the Russians once again. He died in 1881.

Legacy 
Hajji Berzeg is respected by Circassians worldwide as national hero.

Mausoleum 
In late 2021, Circassian activists started a campaign to have his grave restored in a manner that suits a leader and started fundraising. In March 2022, the Turkish government decided to investigate, and later announced that "the grave will be restored in a way that suits the commander, who has shown an example of great valor."

The construction was completed in June 2022, and was opened with a ceremony. Deputy Yavuz Subaşı, who attended the ceremony, said in his speech that "Berzeg is not only a Circassian leader, but also a very important Ottoman commander. Circassians must preserve their language and religion."

In his last will, Hajji Berzeg stated that he wanted at least a piece of his body to be buried in his homeland. To connect Berzeg with his homeland in accordance with his last will, during the ceremony, soil brought from the Circassian homeland by Asım Berzeg, the grandson of Hajji Berzeg, was sprinkled on the grave. Although it was deemed not permissible to open the grave and remove parts of it Islamically, at least some soil taken from the Tepecik Neighborhood, where the grave is located, was taken to the lands where Berzeg was born, to symbolically fulfill his last wish.

Quotes

Sources 

Circassian nobility
1804 births
1881 deaths
North Caucasian independence activists
People of the Caucasian War
Circassian military personnel of the Russo-Circassian War
Ottoman Army generals
Turkish people of Circassian descent